The Best Of The Manhattan Transfer was released in 1981 on the Atlantic Records label by The Manhattan Transfer for the holiday season.  It contained the "best of" their hits from their early Atlantic years (1975–1981). All of the tracks had been previously released on four of their five Atlantic studio albums: The Manhattan Transfer (1975), Pastiche (1978), Extensions (1979), and Mecca for Moderns (1981). No songs from their second studio album, Coming Out (1976), were included on US or international releases, except on early Australian and New Zealand vinyl releases where a slightly different track order omitted "Nightingale" in favour of "Chanson D'Amour" and "Where Did Our Love Go."

The album cover art is an adaptation of A.M. Cassandre's 1927 Nord Express poster.

Track listing
 "Tuxedo Junction" (Erskine Hawkins, William Johnson, Buddy Feyne, Julian Dash) - 2:44
 "The Boy from New York City" (John Taylor, George Davis) - 3:40
 "Twilight Zone/Twilight Tone" (Jay Graydon, Bernard Herrmann, Alan Paul) - 3:55
 "Body and Soul" (Johnny Green, Edward Heyman, Robert Sour, Frank Eyton) - 4:25
 "Candy" (Alex Kramer, Mack David, Joan Whitney) - 3:26
 "Four Brothers" (Jimmy Giuffre, Jon Hendricks) - 3:47
 "Birdland" (Joe Zawinul, Jon Hendricks) - 6:00
 "Gloria" (Esther Navarro) - 2:57
 "Trickle Trickle" (Clarence Bassett) - 2:18
 "Operator" (William Spivery) - 3:09
 "Java Jive" (Milton Drake, Ben Oakland) - 2:44
 "A Nightingale Sang in Berkeley Square" (Manning Sherwin, Eric Maschwitz) - 3:46

Certifications

References

External links
 

1981 greatest hits albums
The Manhattan Transfer albums
Atlantic Records compilation albums